Serge Gainsbourg is a future station on line 11 of the Paris Métro. The station is located at place Henri-Dunant at Les Lilas and slated to open in 2024.

History 
The station was initially given the provisional name of Liberté. It was then renamed Serge Gainsbourg, after the eponymous French artist who had composed the song Le Poinçonneur des Lilas (The ticket-puncher of Lilas) in 1958. On 16 July 2021, the tunnel boring machine, Sofia, arrived at the station after more than 15 months of digging since January 2020, marking the end of excavation works for the extension of line 11. The construction of the main entrance will be completed by the end of January 2022 while the other entrance will be completed by July 2022. Track laying will also begin in February 2022.

Passenger services

Access 
The station will have two entrances equipped with escalators, with the main entrance (with a lift) located at square Henri Dunant and the other entrance located at the intersection of rue de la Liberté and boulevard du Général Leclerc.

Station layout

Platforms 
The station will have a standard configuration with 2 tracks surrounded by 2 side platforms.

Other connections 
The station will be also served by lines 105 and 515 (TillBus) of the RATP bus network, and at night, by line N12 of the Noctilien bus network.

Gallery

References 

Paris Métro line 11
Paris Métro stations in Les Lilas
Future Paris Métro stations
Railway stations scheduled to open in 2023